The Paaruntyi are an indigenous Australian people of the state of New South Wales. They are not to be confused with the Parrintyi.

Country
from Goorimpa north to Brindangabba, Berawinna Downs, as far as the border with Queensland at Hungerford. Their land included Wanaaring and Yantabulla.

Running clockwise from the north, their neighbours were the Kalali and Badyuri, on their eastern flank were the Kurnu, the Naualko lay to their south, while the Wanjiwalku were on their western frontier, together, in the northwest, with the Karenggapa.

Social organization and rites
The Paaruntyi had a two class system of marriage:

The Paaruntyi rites of initiation involved neither circumcision nor subincision.

Alternative names
 Paruindji
 Paruindi, Paruinji, Paroinge
 Barundji, Barungi, Barinji, Bahroonjee, Baroongee, Bahroongee, Barrengee
 Parooinge, Barunga

Notes

Citations

Sources

Aboriginal peoples of New South Wales